Sopolis, son of Hermodorus, was hipparch  of the ile of Hetairoi from Amphipolis, since at least the Triballian campaign of  Alexander the Great 335 BC. That he belonged to the Macedonian aristocracy is indicated not only by his important cavalry command but also by the fact that his son, Hermolaus, served as one of Alexander's Pages in 327 BC.

See also
Ariston of Macedon

References
Who's Who in the Age of Alexander the Great by  Waldemar Heckel 

Ancient Amphipolitans
Generals of Alexander the Great
Ancient Macedonian generals
4th-century BC Macedonians